Weird US or Weird U.S. may refer to:
 Weird US (book series), an American series of travel guides
 Weird U.S. (TV series), a reality television series based on the books